Murder one usually refers to first-degree murder.

Murder One may also refer to:

Film and TV
Murder One, a 1988 biographical crime drama film.
Murder One (TV series), American legal serial broadcast on ABC in 1995–96
Murder 1 (film), first installment, in 2004, of Bollywood film series, Murder

Music 

 Murder One, album by Paul Di'Anno
 Murder One (band), see Mob Rules (band)
 Murder One, bass amplifier head blown up by Lemmy
 Murder One Records Straight from the Streets Sean T.

Songs 

 "Murder One", song by 50 Cent from The Lost Tape (50 Cent album)
 "Murder One", song by Metallica from Hardwired... to Self-Destruct
 "Murder One", song by Sodom from In War and Pieces
 Original name of "Every Heart Broken", a song on the Sugababes' album Catfights and Spotlights
 "Murder 1", song by Y&R Mookey" by @shelove3x_"

Other
Murder One (bookshop), book store in London, open from 1988 to 2009
Heroin (slang)